Antonios Zavaliangos is an American material scientist and engineer, and currently the A. W. Grosvenor professor at Drexel University. He is also a published author.

Zavaliangos is also the Director of the CMSE Graduate Assistance in Areas of National Need, Director of GAANN-Pharma, and Co-Director of the Drexel Research Experiences in Advanced Materials NSF REU Site.

References

American materials scientists
21st-century American engineers
Drexel University faculty
Year of birth missing (living people)
Living people